Ayrton Azzopardi (born 12 September 1993) is a Maltese international footballer who plays for Gudja United as a defensive midfielder.

Career
Born in Pietà, Azzopardi has played club football for Hibernians, Msida Saint-Joseph, Pembroke Athleta, Tarxien Rainbows, Sliema Wanderers, Floriana and San Ġwann.

He made one international appearance for Malta in 2012.

References

1993 births
Living people
Maltese footballers
Malta international footballers
Hibernians F.C. players
Msida Saint-Joseph F.C. players
Pembroke Athleta F.C. players
Tarxien Rainbows F.C. players
Sliema Wanderers F.C. players
Floriana F.C. players
San Gwann F.C. players
Maltese Premier League players
Association football midfielders